Aghjakand is a village in the Kalbajar District of Azerbaijan.

History 
The village was occupied by Armenian forces during the First Nagorno-Karabakh war and administrated as part of Martakert Province of the self-proclaimed Republic of Artsakh.

Azerbaijani forces retook control of the village on 20 October 2020 per the 2020 Nagorno-Karabakh ceasefire agreement.

References 

Populated places in Kalbajar District